Beach soccer has been a South American Beach Games event since the first edition of these games in 2009 in Montevideo, Uruguay.

Men

Summary

Medal table

References
 www.conmebol.com

South American Beach Games
Sports at the South American Games
South American Beach Games